Don't Ask Me may refer to:

 Don't Ask Me (TV programme), a British science show
 Don't Ask Me Ask Britain, a British entertainment poll show
 "Don't Ask Me" (OK Go song)
 "Don't Ask Me" (Heli Simpson song)
 "Don't Ask Me", a song by A Flock of Seagulls from A Flock of Seagulls
 "Don't Ask Me", a song by Nik Kershaw from The Works
 "Don't Ask Me", a song by Public Image Ltd